"Sweet" Charles Sherrell (born Charles Emanuel Sherrell, March 8, 1943) is an American bassist known for recording and performing with James Brown.

Biography 
Born in Nashville, Tennessee, Sherrell began his career playing drums with fellow Nashville residents Jimi Hendrix and Billy Cox, practicing at a club a block from Hendrix's residence. Sherrell learned to play the guitar by washing the car (a Jaguar) of Curtis Mayfield in exchange for guitar lessons. Sherrell soon began teaching himself to play the bass after buying one from a local pawn shop for $69, which led him to join Johnny Jones & The King Kasuals Band, Aretha Franklin's backing group.

Sherrell joined James Brown's band in August 1968, replacing Tim Drummond after Drummond contracted hepatitis in Vietnam. He played on some of Brown's most famous recordings of the late 1960s, including the #1 R&B hits "Say It Loud - I'm Black and I'm Proud", "Mother Popcorn", and "Give It Up or Turnit a Loose" and more. Brown credited him with being his first bassist to incorporate playing techniques such as thumping on the strings that were adopted by other players, including Bootsy Collins. In the 1970s, Sherrell rejoined Brown and performed with The J.B.'s. He later played with Al Green and Maceo & All the King's Men. He played bass on Beau Dollar's Who knows, Marva Whitney's and Lyn Collins album. He sang on a few of Maceo Parkers albums. He also released some recordings with the band Past Present & Future with friends Wade Conklin, Sam Pugh, Ted Hughes, Gail Whitefield, Thomas Smith and James Nixon and he recorded under the name Sweet Charles, including his first solo album, Sweet Charles: For Sweet People, on James Brown's label People Records and the Sweet Charles Sherrell Universal Love album in 2017.

References 

 funky-stuff.com, Archive link

External links 
 sweetcharlessherrell.com - official website
 Discography at waxpoetics.com

1943 births
Living people
African-American guitarists
American funk bass guitarists
American male bass guitarists
American rhythm and blues bass guitarists
James Brown Orchestra members
James Brown vocalists
The J.B.'s members
Musicians from Memphis, Tennessee
Guitarists from Tennessee
20th-century American guitarists